Eman Ahmed Abd El Aty (9 September 1980 – 25 September 2017) was an Egyptian considered to be the heaviest living woman in the world and the second heaviest woman in history, after Carol Yager.

Early life
Abd El Aty was roman. Suffering from a thyroid problem, she had to stop school. She lived in Alexandria.

Treatment
In February 2017, Abd El Aty travelled to Mumbai, Maharashtra, India Saifee Hospital where a group of doctors, headed by Muffazal Lakdawala, treated her successfully using bariatric surgery. They included an endocrinologist, a chest physician, cardiologist, a cardiac surgeon, two bariatric surgeons, two intensivists, and three anaesthetists. She remained in Mumbai after the operation for several months.

She lost about  after undergoing weight-loss treatment in India. She left on 4 May 2017 for the United Arab Emirates for long-term treatment. The doctors, treating her, said she was also suffering from a "cardiac issue" and infected bed sores. She was being treated by a team of 20 doctors at Abu Dhabi's Burjeel Hospital.

Death
Abd El Aty died on Monday, 25 September 2017 at 4:35 pm, 16 days after her 37th birthday, due to complications from the underlying comorbid conditions, including heart disease and kidney dysfunction, at Burjeel Hospital, Abu Dhabi, UAE since her admission to the hospital in May.

References

External links
 Image
 Eman Ahmed, once ‘world’s heaviest woman’ dies: 10 things to know about her stay in India

1980 births
2017 deaths
Obesity
People from Alexandria
Deaths from kidney failure